Bar Aftab-e Chel Khorasan (also Romanized as Bar Āftāb-e Chel Khorasān; also known as Bar Āftāb) is a village in Shalal and Dasht-e Gol Rural District, in the Central District of Andika County, Khuzestan Province, Iran. At the 2006 census, its population was 35, in 6 families.

References 

Populated places in Andika County